Auxiliary may refer to:

 A backup site or system

In language
 Auxiliary language (disambiguation)
 Auxiliary verb

In military and law enforcement
 Auxiliary police
 Auxiliaries, civilians or quasi-military personnel who provide support of some kind to a military service
 Auxiliaries (Roman military)

In religion
 Auxiliary bishop, in the Roman Catholic Church
 Auxiliary organization (LDS Church)

In technology
 Auxiliary input jack and auxiliary cable, generally for audio; frequently associated with mobile device audio
 Aux-send of a mixing console
 An auxiliary Port is a common port found on many Cisco routers for CLI access.

Other uses
 Auxiliary route, also known as "special route", in road transportation
 An auxiliary route of the Interstate Highway System in the United States
 Auxiliary ship is a naval vessel designed to operate in support of combat ships and other naval operations
 Auxiliary (fraternity or sorority)
 A marching band color guard

See also
 
 
 Aux (disambiguation)
 Axillary (disambiguation)